Riptortus linearis is a species of true bug in the family Alydidae. It is a pest of sorghum in India.

References

Alydinae
Insect pests of millets